Justus Kane Sheffield (born May 13, 1996) is an American professional baseball pitcher in the Seattle Mariners organization. He previously played in Major League Baseball (MLB) for the New York Yankees.

He was drafted by the Cleveland Indians in the first round of the 2014 MLB draft. During the 2016 trade deadline, he was traded to the Yankees, where he made his MLB debut on September 19, 2018. Following the 2018 season, Sheffield was traded to the Seattle Mariners.

Career
Sheffield attended Tullahoma High School in Tullahoma, Tennessee. He threw two no-hitters while in high school, including a 17–strikeout game as a senior. He finished his senior season 11–0 with a 0.34 earned run average (ERA) and 131 strikeouts in  innings pitched. He also batted .405/.478/.620 with three home runs. For his play he was named the Gatorade National Baseball Player of the Year. Sheffield committed to play college baseball at Vanderbilt University.

Cleveland Indians
The Cleveland Indians selected Sheffield in the first round (31st overall) of the 2014 MLB draft, and he signed with Cleveland, bypassing Vanderbilt. In 2015, he pitched for the Lake County Captains of the Class A Midwest League. He threw  innings, and had a 9-4 record and a 3.31 ERA. Sheffield began the 2016 season with the Lynchburg Hillcats of the Class A-Advanced Carolina League.

New York Yankees
On July 31, 2016, the Indians traded Sheffield along with Clint Frazier, Ben Heller and J. P. Feyereisen to the New York Yankees for Andrew Miller. He finished the 2016 season with the Tampa Yankees of the Class A-Advanced Florida State League, where he posted a 10–6 record with a 3.09 ERA. He spent 2017 with the Trenton Thunder of the Class AA Eastern League, going 7-6 with a 3.18 ERA in  innings pitched.

In 2018, Sheffield started the season with the Scranton/Wilkes-Barre RailRiders of the Class AAA International League. In August, the team converted him into a relief pitcher in preparation for a September call-up to the major leagues.

He made his MLB debut on September 19 against the Boston Red Sox and gave up a single to his first batter, Brock Holt.

Seattle Mariners
On November 19, 2018, the Yankees traded Sheffield, Dom Thompson-Williams, and Erik Swanson to the Seattle Mariners for James Paxton. Sheffield made his Mariner debut on April 26, 2019. He finished 0-1 in 8 games (7 starts) for Seattle. He struck out 37 in 36 innings.

In 2020, Sheffield was 4–3 with a 3.58 ERA in 10 starts.

In 2021, Sheffield appeared in 21 games, 15 as a starter.  He finished with a record of 7-8, along with a 6.58 ERA.

In 2022, Sheffield appeared in 6 games, starting in one of those appearances and pitched 11.2 innings in total. He finished with a record of 1-0 and a 3.86 ERA. Sheffield was designated for assignment on January 19, 2023 to make room for Tommy La Stella on the roster. On January 26, Sheffield cleared waivers and was sent outright to the Triple-A Tacoma Rainiers.

Personal life
His brother, Jordan Sheffield, is a pitcher for the Colorado Rockies.

Sheffield was arrested on January 12, 2015, and was charged with underage drinking and aggravated burglary. He pleaded guilty at Coffee County Court House in Tullahoma, Tennessee, to charges of underage drinking and criminal trespass with a deferred judgment, so that the charges could be expunged from his record in a year.

References

External links

1996 births
Living people
People from Tullahoma, Tennessee
Baseball players from Tennessee
Major League Baseball pitchers
New York Yankees players
Seattle Mariners players
Arizona League Indians players
Lake County Captains players
Lynchburg Hillcats players
Tampa Yankees players
Trenton Thunder players
Gulf Coast Yankees players
Scottsdale Scorpions players
Scranton/Wilkes-Barre RailRiders players
Tacoma Rainiers players
Arkansas Travelers players